Beauvechain is a municipality of Wallonia located in the province of Walloon Brabant,  Belgium. 

On 1 January 2006 the municipality had 6,529 inhabitants. The total area is 38.58 km2, giving a population density of 169 inhabitants per km2.

The municipality consists of the following districts: Beauvechain, Hamme-Mille, L’Écluse, Nodebais, and Tourinnes-la-Grosse.

Beauvechain has several protected heritage sites. It is also home to Beauvechain Air Base which formerly flew F-16 Fighting Falcon jets.

Sports
Beauvechain is the home of SC Beauvechain football club. Since the 2011–2012 season the club has benefited from investment allowing the creation of new pitches (one synthetic and one grass) as well as a new club house and changing rooms.

Gallery

References

External links 
 
Official web site (in French)

 
Municipalities of Walloon Brabant